The 2018–19 K.R.C. Genk season was the club's 31st season in existence and the 24th consecutive season in the top flight of Belgian football. In addition to the domestic league, Genk participated in this season's edition of the Belgian Cup and the UEFA Europa League. The season covered the period from 1 July 2018 to 30 June 2019.

Players

First-team squad

Out on loan

Competitions

Overview

Belgian First Division A

Regular season

Results summary

Results by round

Matches
The league fixtures were announced on 12 June 2018.

Championship play-offs

Results summary

Results by round

Matches

Belgian Cup

UEFA Europa League

Second qualifying round

Third qualifying round

Third qualifying round

Group stage

The draw for the group stage was held on 31 August 2018.

Knockout phase

Round of 32
The draw for the round of 32 was held on 17 December 2018.

References

K.R.C. Genk seasons
Genk
Belgian football championship-winning seasons